Gurpanthjeet Singh (born 7 December 2000) is an Indian professional footballer who plays as a defender for I-League side Indian Arrows.

Club career
Singh made his professional debut for I-League side Indian Arrows on 14 January 2021 against Sudeva Delhi. He came on as a second-half stoppage time substitute as Indian Arrows were defeated 0–3.

Career statistics

Club

References

2000 births
Living people
Indian footballers
Association football defenders
Indian Arrows players
I-League players
Footballers from Punjab, India